Harpreet Sawhney is an American electrical engineer at SRI International in West Windsor, New Jersey. He was named a Fellow of the Institute of Electrical and Electronics Engineers (IEEE) in 2012 for his work with video algorithms.

References 

Fellow Members of the IEEE
Living people
Year of birth missing (living people)
Place of birth missing (living people)
American electrical engineers